In geometry, the augmented truncated cube is one of the Johnson solids. As its name suggests, it is created by attaching a square cupola onto one octagonal face of a truncated cube.

References
Norman W. Johnson, "Convex Solids with Regular Faces", Canadian Journal of Mathematics, 18, 1966, pages 169–200. Contains the original enumeration of the 92 solids and the conjecture that there are no others.
  The first proof that there are only 92 Johnson solids.

External links
 

Johnson solids